New Hampshire Route 118 (abbreviated NH 118) is a  secondary north–south highway in Grafton County, New Hampshire. NH 118 stretches from Woodstock in the White Mountains Region south to Canaan in the Upper Valley region.

The northern terminus of NH 118 is at New Hampshire Route 112 (the Lost River Road) in Woodstock. The road runs southward through the towns of Warren, Wentworth, Rumney, and Dorchester. The southern terminus of NH 118 is at U.S. Route 4 in Canaan. From Canaan to Wentworth, the highway is named Dorchester Road.  The section from Warren to the Lost River is known as the Sawyer Highway.

Major intersections

References

External links

 New Hampshire State Route 118 on Flickr

118
Transportation in Grafton County, New Hampshire